Cai Liwen is a Chinese Paralympic backstroke, freestyle and medley swimmer. She represented China at the 2016 Summer Paralympics held in Rio de Janeiro, Brazil and she won the silver medal in the women's 100 metre backstroke S11 event. She competed at the 2017 World Para Swimming Championships held in Mexico City, Mexico and at the 2019 World Para Swimming Championships held in London, United Kingdom. At the 2020 Summer Paralympics she won the gold medal in the 100m Backstroke S11 with a world record of 1:13.46, one silver medal and one bronze medal.

In 2018, she competed at the Asian Para Games held in Jakarta, Indonesia. She won one gold medal and one silver medal.

References

External links 
 

Living people
Year of birth missing (living people)
Place of birth missing (living people)
Chinese female backstroke swimmers
Chinese female freestyle swimmers
Chinese female medley swimmers
Swimmers at the 2016 Summer Paralympics
Swimmers at the 2020 Summer Paralympics
Medalists at the 2016 Summer Paralympics
Medalists at the 2020 Summer Paralympics
Paralympic silver medalists for China
Paralympic bronze medalists for China
Paralympic medalists in swimming
Paralympic swimmers of China
Medalists at the World Para Swimming Championships
S11-classified Paralympic swimmers
21st-century Chinese women
Medalists at the 2018 Asian Para Games